Hafenreffer is a German surname. Notable people with the surname include:

Matthias Hafenreffer (1561–1619), German Lutheran theologian
Samuel Hafenreffer (1587–1660), German physician

German-language surnames